Simon Vlasov (born January 10, 1981) is a Russian motorcycle speedway rider who rode in Speedway World Cup for Russia.

References 

1981 births
Living people
Russian speedway riders